Frank Shaw Marshall, Baron Marshall of Leeds KBE (26 September 1915 – 1 November 1990) was a British lawyer and politician who was a member of the House of Lords from 1980 until his death in 1990.

Biography
Marshall was born in Wakefield and attended Queen Elizabeth Grammar School. He then studied law at Downing College, Cambridge. During the Second World War, he served in the Royal Tank Regiment, and after the war qualified as a solicitor.  He was a member of Leeds City Council from 1960 and led the council from 1967 to 1972.

He was knighted in 1971 for "services to local government" and was created a life peer on 11 July 1980, taking the title Baron Marshall of Leeds, of Shadwell in the City of Leeds. He was considered to be "a grandee of the Conservative Party at the national level".

He was chairman of the Municipal Mutual Insurance Group of Companies from 1978, and of Dartford International Ferry Terminal Ltd from 1987; a director of the Leeds and Holbeck Building Society 1962–1968 and its president in 1967–69 and 1977–79; and a director of several other companies, including Barr & Wallace Arnold Trust PLC from 1953.  From 1983–1987, he served as the President of the Institute of Transport Administration.

In 1978, he was commissioned to review the local government of London, at a time where there was increasing pressure to abolish the Greater London Council, hence he produced the Marshall Report.  He was an honorary freeman of Leeds and a freeman of the City of London.

He married Mary Barr, daughter of the founder of Barr and Wallace Arnold coach holiday company, and they had two daughters, Angela and Virginia. His daughters donated the glass Angel Screen by Sally Scott to Leeds Minster in 1997, in memory of both their parents.

References

1915 births
1990 deaths
Alumni of Downing College, Cambridge
British Army personnel of World War II
Conservative Party (UK) life peers
Councillors in Leeds
Knights Bachelor
People educated at Queen Elizabeth Grammar School, Wakefield
Royal Tank Regiment officers
Life peers created by Elizabeth II